Aitor Larrazábal Bilbao (born 21 June 1971) is a Spanish former professional footballer who played solely for Athletic Bilbao, currently manager of Gernika Club. 

A left-back of attacking penchant, he appeared in 445 competitive matches for his only club and was also a penalty kick specialist, scoring at least one La Liga goal in 13 of his 14 seasons.

Playing career
Larrazábal was born in Bilbao, Biscay. Having joined Athletic Bilbao's youth ranks at 11, he started playing professionally with its reserves in the Segunda División, and made his first-team debut on 2 September 1990 in a 1–0 away loss against CD Tenerife, finishing his first year in La Liga with 18 games.

From then onwards, Larrazábal was an undisputed starter for the Basques, scoring and assisting alike. In the 1997–98 season, as Bilbao finished runners-up, he scored a career-best seven league goals, being instrumental as his team qualified for the subsequent edition of the UEFA Champions League, where he featured, for instance, in both group stage draws against Juventus FC, although they eventually ranked last.

After the emergence of Asier del Horno (another Lezama youth graduate) in the 2002–03 campaign, Larrazábal still featured prominently in his last two seasons – 36 matches, three goals – but eventually retired from the game in May 2004 at the age of 33, after a two-decade link with a sole club.

Coaching career
Larrazábal subsequently became a coach: after starting in amateur football, he joined lowly SD Lemona (Basque Country) from Segunda División B in 2009, leading the side to the sixth position in his first year and narrowly missing out on play-off qualification. After a second season in Lemoa in which the team reached the final of the Copa Federación de España, he returned to Athletic Bilbao to take up a position as sporting director, following the election of former teammate Josu Urrutia as president in July 2011.

In 2013, a reorganisation of functions at the club saw Larrazábal take over responsibility for its youth system, with José María Amorrortu (the director of football) focusing on the senior team. The former resigned from the position in summer 2015, citing professional differences and a desire to return to managerial roles.

In April 2016, Larrazábal became manager of third-tier Marbella FC for a short spell, and although they only collected two points from his three games in charge, it was enough to successfully steer them away from the relegation zone by the end of the campaign. For the following season he moved back to the Basque Country, taking control of SD Amorebieta of the same league; they escaped relegation by a single point.

Larrazábal was appointed at Barakaldo CF in the same division in June 2017. Three years later, following a brief spell at Salamanca CF UDS, he returned to his previous club. 

On 28 December 2020, Larrazábal was replaced by his assistant Germán Beltrán, but continued in his role of sporting director. He returned to management in June 2022, joining Segunda Federación side Gernika Club.

Personal life
Larrazábal's son, Gaizka, is also a footballer. A right winger by position, in summer 2017 he joined Athletic Bilbao (being assigned to the reserves) from Zamudio SD, having played against the Amorebieta team managed by his father during the preceding season.

Managerial statistics

See also
List of one-club men

References

External links

1971 births
Living people
Spanish footballers
Footballers from Bilbao
Association football defenders
La Liga players
Segunda División players
Bilbao Athletic footballers
Athletic Bilbao footballers
Spain youth international footballers
Spain under-21 international footballers
Spain under-23 international footballers
Basque Country international footballers
Spanish football managers
Segunda División B managers
Segunda Federación managers
SD Lemona managers
SD Amorebieta managers
Barakaldo CF managers
Salamanca CF UDS managers
Athletic Bilbao non-playing staff